Airy Castle is a village in the Jamaican parish of Saint Thomas.

Populated places in Saint Thomas Parish, Jamaica